Regie Hamm (born May 1, 1967) is an American singer-songwriter. He has multiple credits as a songwriter, producer, musician (keys, drums, vocals), and artist.

Early and personal life
His father was a traveling Pentecostal minister.  Regie played drums in his father's band at an early age and eventually left to go to college. He is married to Yolanda and they adopted a girl from China, whom they named Isabella. Isabella has a rare genetic disorder called Angelman syndrome, which causes severe development delays. They also have a son named Gabe.

Singing career
After college, Regie began experiencing songwriting success with songs recorded by the likes of Kenny Loggins, Maxi Priest, Bob Carlisle, Jaci Velasquez, and Clay Crosse. He wrote one of the most popular Christian songs of the 1990s, entitled "I Surrender All," recorded by Clay Crosse.

Hamm released a solo-CD entitled American Dreams on Universal South in 2003, and this CD spawned the Top 20 AC hit entitled "Babies," in addition to his success in the Contemporary Christian music market. The song gained mainstream popularity after it was featured on Delilah Rene's nationally syndicated love-songs program.

SESAC's website reports that Hamm's new EP, titled Starlight, was released in conjunction with the American Idol finale on his website, and shortly on iTunes.

Songwriting career
In 2008, Hamm wrote a song called "The Time of My Life" at the encouragement of his wife, Yolanda, an avid American Idol fan.  He submitted the song for the American Idol Songwriting Competition, and won.  The song became the finale song and first single for the winner of the show's seventh season, David Cook. The RIAA certified "The Time of My Life" platinum on December 12, 2008, for selling over 1 million digital downloads. The song was particularly successful on U.S. Adult radio. The song reached number one on the Hot Adult Contemporary Tracks chart.

In addition to the American Idol success, Regie Hamm has written for Clay Aiken and Lonestar.

He has had over 400 cuts as a songwriter, and has been named SESAC songwriter of the year 4 times.

Regie Hamm has a solo album titled Set It on Fire and a book titled Angels & Idols, both due for release June 15, 2010.

In February 2016, Regie Hamm wrote "We Got Lucky", a song with Army veteran Scott Sullivan, a physician assistant who served in heavy combat in Sadr City, Baghdad, Iraq at a front-line aid station that took in multiple combat casualties.

Discography

Albums
American Dreams (Universal South Records, 2003)
Set It On Fire (2010)

Awards and nominations

References

External links
 

American male singer-songwriters
Living people
1967 births
Musicians from Nashville, Tennessee
Place of birth missing (living people)
Singer-songwriters from Tennessee